Belle Creek Township is a township in Goodhue County, Minnesota, United States. The population was 437 at the 2000 census.

History
Belle Creek Township was organized in 1858, and took its name from the Belle Creek.

Geography

Demographics
As of the census of 2000, there were 437 people, 159 households, and 121 families residing in the township. The population density was 12.3 people per square mile (4.7/km2). There were 165 housing units at an average density of 4.6/sq mi (1.8/km2).  The racial makeup of the township was 98.63% White, 0.23% Pacific Islander, and 1.14% from two or more races.

There were 159 households, out of which 40.3% had children under the age of 18 living with them, 68.6% were married couples living together, 4.4% had a female householder with no husband present, and 23.3% were non-families. 20.1% of all households were made up of individuals, and 9.4% had someone living alone who was 65 years of age or older. The average household size was 2.75 and the average family size was 3.23.

In the township the population was spread out, with 30.7% under the age of 18, 8.2% from 18 to 24, 27.2% from 25 to 44, 20.8% from 45 to 64, and 13.0% who were 65 years of age or older. The median age was 36 years. For every 100 females, there were 114.2 males. For every 100 females age 18 and over, there were 119.6 males.

The median income for a household in the township was $52,188, and the median income for a family was $53,500. Males had a median income of $35,179 versus $22,000 for females. The per capita income for the township was $20,226.  About 5.5% of families and 7.6% of the population were below the poverty line, including 11.9% of those under age 18 and 8.9% of those age 65 or over.

References

Townships in Goodhue County, Minnesota
Townships in Minnesota